Huron South was a federal electoral district in Ontario, Canada, that was represented in the House of Commons of Canada from 1867 to 1935. It was created by the British North America Act of 1867 which divided the County of Huron into two ridings: Huron North and Huron South.

In 1872, the County of Huron was divided into three ridings, and Huron Centre was created. The South Riding was defined to consist of the Townships of Goderich, Stanley, Hay, Stephen, and Usborne, and the Village of Clinton.

In 1882, the South Riding was redefined to consist of the townships of McKillop, Hullett, Tuckersmith, Stanley, and Hay, the town of Seaforth, and the village of Bayfield.

In 1903, the county of Huron was divided into three ridings: Huron East, Huron West and Huron South. Huron South was redefined to exclude the township of Hullett, and include the townships of Stephen and Usborne and the villages of Exeter and Hensall.

In 1914, the county of Huron was divided into two ridings: Huron North and Huron South. Huron South was expanded to include the townships of Hullet and Goderich, and the town of Clinton.

In 1924, Huron South was redefined to consist of the part of the County of Huron lying south of and excluding the town of Goderich, and north of and including the townships of Goderich, Hullett, and McKillop.

The electoral district was abolished in 1933 when it was redistributed between Huron North and Huron—Perth ridings.

Election results

On the election being declared void, 22 February 1874:

On Mr. McMillan's resignation, Dec. 1883:

On Mr. Gunn's death, 9 December 1907:

   

On Mr. McMillan's death, 7 June 1932:

See also 

 List of Canadian federal electoral districts
 Past Canadian electoral districts

References

External links 
Riding history from the Library of Parliament

Former federal electoral districts of Ontario